Ruyi Lake is a small artificial lake located in the city of Zhengzhou, Henan, China.

References

Lakes of China
Bodies of water of Henan